Koglin is a surname. Notable people with the surname include:

Brian Koglin (born 1997), German footballer
Mike Koglin, German DJ and producer

See also
Coughlin

Surnames of Irish origin
Surnames of Swiss origin